Archoleptoneta is a genus of North American spiders that was first described by Carl Eduard Adolph Gerstaecker in 1974.  it contains only two species, both found in the United States: A. gertschi and A. schusteri.

References

Araneomorphae genera
Araneomorphae
Spiders of the United States